Chilliwack Transit System operates the public transportation system for the City of Chilliwack in the Upper Fraser Valley of British Columbia, Canada. Funding is provided under a partnership between the city and BC Transit, the provincial agency which plans and manages municipal transit systems. handyDART provides door-to-door transportation for people whose disability prevents them from using conventional bus service.

Agassiz-Harrison Transit System, operating on bus route 71, runs from the Chilliwack downtown exchange to Rosedale, Popkum, Agassiz and Harrison Hot Springs. Fares on this route are based on a zonal system and passengers can transfer to the Chilliwack Transit System for free while Chilliwack passengers pay the difference in fares when transferring onto the Agassiz-Harrison bus.

Funding for the Chilliwack/Agassiz-Harrison Transit System is cost shared between the District of Kent and BC Transit in partnership with the Fraser Valley Regional District, the Village of Harrison Hot Springs and the City of Chilliwack.

Routes
The Chilliwack Transit System is funded by the City of Chilliwack and BC Transit.

Route numbers were renumbered in March 2022 to prevent confusion with the neighboring Central Fraser Valley Transit System.

References

External links
Chilliwack/Agassiz-Harrison Transit System

Transit agencies in British Columbia
Transport in Chilliwack
Kent, British Columbia